Tukur (also Romanized as Tūkūr and Tūgūr; also known as Beyk Tūkūr-e Pā’īn and Bīk-e Tūkūr) is a village in Takmaran Rural District, Sarhad District, Shirvan County, North Khorasan Province, Iran. At the 2006 census, its population was 470, in 119 families.

References 

Populated places in Shirvan County